Levalsa Meor is a hamlet in Cornwall, England, UK. It is in the civil parish of Pentewan Valley.

References

Hamlets in Cornwall